

The AD-150 is a high-speed VTOL tilting ducted fan unmanned aerial vehicle that is being developed by American Dynamics Flight Systems as a future competitor for the United States Marine Corps' Tier III VUAS program as well as other current and future United States VTOL UAV programs.

Development 
The AD-150 program began in response to continued interest in maritime capable VTOL UAVs by the United States Department of Defense.

The AD-150 utilizes two wing-tip mounted High Torque Aerial Lift (HTAL) lift and propulsion systems to provide the thrust needed to sustain and transition between hover and forward flight. The two HTAL systems are driven by a single Pratt & Whitney Canada PW200 Turboshaft engine.

The vehicle's propulsion configuration is similar to the Doak VZ-4 in that the two propulsion systems are able to tilt from vertical to horizontal mode in order to achieve high-speed forward flight. Unlike the Doak VZ-4, however, the propulsion systems in the AD-150 are also able to pivot longitudinally.

A full-scale model of the AD-150 was displayed for the first time at the Association for Unmanned Vehicle Systems International's (AUVSI) Unmanned Systems North America exhibition in Washington D.C. on August 7, 2007.

In February 2010, the University of Maryland's Industrial Partnerships program approved $135,150 in funding to test a scale model of the company's patented High Torque Aerial Lift (HTAL) system in a tunnel at the university.  They will utilize a 1/3–1/2 scale model that will be tested at different fan and tunnel speeds and duct angles to represent the transition between vertical and horizontal flight.

Specifications (as designed)

See also

References

AD-150
Abandoned civil aircraft projects of the United States
Unmanned military aircraft of the United States
Single-engined twin-prop tractor aircraft
Tilting ducted fan aircraft
Mid-wing aircraft